This is a list of Therion's current, former, guest, live members and people directly related with the band. For detailed information, such as voice range or specified songs appearance, see the proper album article of the relevant year.

Current members 
 Christofer Johnsson – guitars, keyboards, programming, Hammond organ, orchestral arrangement (1987–present), vocals (1987–2006)
 Sami Karppinen – drums (1998–2003, present)
 Thomas Vikström – lead vocals (2007–present)
 Nalle "Grizzly" Påhlsson – bass (2008–present, 2008–2019 (touring))
 Christian Vidal – guitar (2009–present)
 Lori Lewis – vocals (2007–present)

Former members 

Erik Gustafsson – bass (1987–1991)
Oskar Forss – drums (1987–1992)
Peter Hansson – guitars, keyboards (1987–1992)
Matti Kärki – vocals (1989)
Andreas "Wallan" Wahl – bass (1992–1994)
Piotr Wawrzeniuk – drums, vocals (1992–1997)
Magnus Barthelson – guitars (1992–1994)
Fredrik Isaksson – bass (1994–1995)
Lars Rosenberg – bass (1996–1997)
Jonas Mellberg – guitars (1995–1996)
Johan Niemann – bass (1999–2008)
Kristian Niemann – guitars (1999–2009)
Richard Evensand – drums (2001–2004)
Petter Karlsson – drums (2004–2008)
Johan Koleberg – drums (2008–2016)

Current live members 
Chiara Malvestiti – vocals (2015–present)
Rosalía Sairem – vocals (2019–present)
Chris David - bass (2021-present)

Former live members 
 Dan Lonard – keyboards (1994–1996)
 Kimberly Goss – keyboards, vocals (1996–1997)
 Ann-Sofie – vocals (1996)
 Jan – vocals (1996)
 Piotr Wawrzeniuk – vocals (1997)
 Kim Blomkvist – bass (1998)
 Cinthia Acosta Vera – vocals (1998)
 Martina Astner – vocals (1998–1999)
 Risto Hämäläinen – vocals (2000–2006)
 Petra Aho – vocals (2001)
 Johanna Mårlöv – vocals (2001, 2004–2006; died 2013)
 Jari-Petri Heino – vocals (2001, 2004–2006)
 Anders Engberg – vocals (2001)
 Maria Ottoson – vocals (2001)
 Suvi Virtanen – vocals (2001, 2004–2006)
 Mats Levén – vocals, guitars (2004–2007, May 2019)
 Karin Fjellander – vocals (2004–2006)
 Snowy Shaw – vocals (2006–2010, 2010–2012, 2013)
 Katarina Lilja – vocals (2006–2007, 2008–2011)
 Thomas Vikström – guitars (2007–2009), vocals (2007–2009)
 Piotr Wawrzeniuk – vocals (2007)
 Messiah Marcolin – vocals (2007)
 Ferdy Doernberg – keyboards (2007)
 Magnus Barthelson – guitars (2008)
  Linnéa Vikström – vocals (2010–2018)
 Waldemar Sorychta – bass (2010–2011)
 Therese Person – vocals (2011)
 Stefan Jernståhl – keyboards (2012)
 Sandra Laureano – vocals (2014)
 Sami Karppinen – drums (2014)
 Isa García Navas – vocals (2015, 2019)
 Emmie Asplund – vocals (2015–2018 as stand-in)
 Fredrik Andersson – drums (2017)
 Justin Biggs – bass (2019)
 Johan Koleberg – drums (2022)

Session and guest musicians 

 Anna Granqvist – vocals (1992)
 Claudia Maria Mokri – vocals (1994)
 Dan Swanö – vocals (1996)
 Peter Tägtgren – guitars (1996)
 Axel Patz – vocals (1996)
 Tobias Sidegård – vocals (1996)
 Jan Peter Genkel – grand piano, keyboards, programming (1996)
 Anja Krenz – vocals (1996)
 Gottfried Koch – programming, keyboards, acoustic guitar (1996)
 Sarah Jezebel Deva – vocals (1997–1999)
 Wolf Simon – drums (1998–1999)
 Jan Kazda – bass (1998–1999)
 Tommy Eriksson – guitars (1998)
 Ralf Scheepers – vocals (1998)
 Martina Astner – vocals (1998–1999)
 Lorentz Aspen – hammond organ (1998–1999)
 Hansi Kürsch – vocals (2000)
 Marika Schonberg – vocals (2001)
 Erika Andersson – vocals (2001)
 Carl Rahmqvist – vocals (2001)
 Piotr Wawrzeniuk – vocals (2004)
 Anne Marie Krawe – vocals (2004)
 Ulrika Skarby – vocals (2004)
 Mats Levén – vocals, guitar (2004–2007)
 Hannah Holgersson – vocals (2006)
 Jonas Samuelsson-Nerbe – vocals (2007)
 Ken Hensley – Hammond organ (2007)
 Joakim Svalberg – Hammond organ (2007)
 Rolf Pilotti – flute (2007)
 Stefan Glaumann – tambourine (2007)
 Karin Fjellander – vocals (2007)
 Anna Nyhlin – vocals (2007)
 Chris Laney – guitars (2009–2010)
 Marcus Jupither – vocals (2009–2010)
 Petter Karlsson – vocals (2009–2010)
 Mats Öberg – harmonica (2009–2010)
 Hans Gardemar – accordion (2010)
 Mika "Michayah Belfagor" Hakola – vocals (2010)
 Snowy Shaw – drums (2020)
 Björn Höglund – drums (2020–2021)

Timeline (Official Members Only)

Cover artists 
Artists of cover artworks:

 Thomas Ewerhard (Secret of the Runes, Live in Midgard, Lemuria, Sirius B, Celebrators of Becoming, Gothic Kabbalah, Live Gothic, The Miskolc Experience, Sitra Ahra, Beloved Antichrist)
 Peter Grøn (Theli, A'arab Zaraq – Lucid Dreaming)
 Calle Schewen (Time Shall Tell)
 Gary Querns (Of Darkness...)
 "Nico & Theresa" (Vovin, Crowning of Atlantis, Deggial)
 Kristian Wåhlin (Beyond Sanctorum, Symphony Masses: Ho Drakon Ho Megas, Lepaca Kliffoth)

Producers 
 Siegfried Bemm (1998, 2000)
 Jan Peter Genkel (1996–1997)
 Rex Gisslén (1992–1993)
 Stefan Glaumann (2007)
 Christofer Johnsson (since 1987)
 Gottfried Koch (1996–1997)
 Tomas Skogsberg (1990–1991)
 Peter Tägtgren (1997)

Orchestras and choirs 
 Barmbek Symphony Orchestra (Theli) (not an actual orchestra, but a library of classic samples humorously named after a subway station next to the band's studio)
 Indigo Orchestra (Vovin, Crowning of Atlantis)
 Kūhn Mixed Choir (Sirius B, Lemuria)
 North German Radio Choir (Theli, A'arab Zaraq – Lucid Dreaming)
 Prague Philharmonic Orchestra (Sirius B, Lemuria)
 Siren Choir (Theli)

See also 

 Thomas Karlsson, has written most of the lyrics on albums 1996–2010

References 
 
 Celebrators of Becoming

 Therion members
Members
Therion